Laurel Grove is an unincorporated community in Coos County, Oregon, United States. It lies along U.S. Route 101 south of Bandon and east of Bandon State Natural Area.

References

Unincorporated communities in Coos County, Oregon
Unincorporated communities in Oregon